R. Torre & Company, Inc. is a San Francisco-based company that produces the Torani brand of flavoring syrups, sauces, and blended drink bases. The company was founded in 1925 by Rinaldo and Ezilda Torre.

Torani dates back to 1925, when husband and wife Rinaldo and Ezilda Torre, immigrants from Lucca, Italy, introduced Torani syrups to the North Beach neighborhood of San Francisco. Mixing their syrup recipes with sparkling water, the Torres introduced the classic Italian soda to local cafes, and soon began mixing, blending and selling Torani Syrups from their Italian wholesale grocery.

In 1957, the Torres' son-in-law, Harry Lucheta, took over the business and oversaw Torani's growth from a local San Francisco business to an international brand.

Torani is currently owned by Paul Lucheta and Lisa Lucheta, grandchildren of the founders Rinaldo and Ezilda Torre. The company employs over 100 people, and Torani products are distributed in over 40 countries. From the late 1990s until March 2020, Torani's headquarters, which include both its business offices and manufacturing facilities, were located in South San Francisco, California, until a March 2020 move to San Leandro during the COVID-19 pandemic. One notable syrup is their Chicken 'N Waffles syrup, originally started as an April Fools' joke. The current CEO is Melanie Dulbecco.

References

External links

Drink companies based in California
Food manufacturers of the United States
Manufacturing companies based in San Francisco
Food and drink in the San Francisco Bay Area
1925 establishments in California
Food and drink companies based in California
Certified B Corporations in the Food & Beverage Industry